The 1965 Canadian federal election was held on November 8, 1965 to elect members of the House of Commons of Canada of the 27th Parliament of Canada. The Liberal Party of Prime Minister Lester B. Pearson was re-elected with a larger number of seats in the House. Although the Liberals lost a small share of the popular vote, they were able to win more seats, falling just short of a majority.

Overview
The Liberals campaigned on their record of having kept the promises made in the 1963 campaign, which included job creation, lowering income taxes, higher wages, higher family allowances and student loans. They promised to implement a national Medicare program by 1967, and the Canada Pension Plan system of public pensions. The party also urged voters to give them a majority for "five more years of prosperity". The party campaigned under the slogans, "Good Things Happen When a Government Cares About People", and, "For Continued Prosperity".

The Progressive Conservative Party of John Diefenbaker, campaigning with the slogan, "Policies for People, Policies for Progress", gained a small number of seats. Despite losing a second time, Diefenbaker refused to resign as party leader, and was eventually forced from the position by a campaign by the party president Dalton Camp. Diefenbaker subsequently ran for re-election as leader in the party's 1967 leadership convention, but lost to Robert Stanfield.

Old age pensions were an important issue in this campaign. The Liberal Party pointed to having increased the pension to $75 per month for persons 70 years of age and older, planned to reduce the eligibility age to 65 by 1970 and also promised a "Canada Assistance Program" payment for seniors with lower incomes. The PCs promised to increase OAP to $100 per month for all those 70 years old and over.

The New Democratic Party of Tommy Douglas, campaigning under the slogan, "Fed up? Speak up! Vote for the New Democrats!", increased its share of the popular vote by more than four and a half percentage points, and became the third largest party in the House of Commons. However, it won only four more seats as it continued to fail to make the electoral break-through that was hoped for when the party was founded in 1960.

These aforementioned net gains came at the expense of the Social Credit Party of Canada which was split in two before this election. Réal Caouette led French-Canadian Socreds out of the party into the new Ralliement créditiste (Social Credit Rally) but lost more than half of the party's Quebec seats. Robert N. Thompson continued to lead the Social Credit Party in English-speaking Canada, and actually managed to gain one seat outside Quebec although it was still fewer than the French-Canadian breakaway party. However, even the combined seat totals of the two factions would not have been enough to prevent the NDP from replacing Social Credit as the third largest party. The election would be the last time that the Social Credit Party elected federal candidates outside Quebec.

This was the first election for the Rhinoceros Party of Canada, a satirical party led by Cornelius the First. The party fielded only one candidate. Cornelius, a resident of the Granby zoo, did not seek election because Canadian election law does not permit rhinoceroses (or other zoo animals) to be nominated.

In order to govern, the minority Liberals relied on the New Democratic Party and occasionally other smaller opposition parties in order to remain in power. Pearson announced his intention to resign as Liberal leader in December 1967 and was replaced the following April by Pierre Trudeau.

Notably, this election marked the last time that a single conservative party did not win an absolute majority of the vote in Alberta (although the totals of the Progressive Conservatives and Social Credit combined did add up to over two thirds of the vote in that province).

Party platforms
Liberal Party:
 $500 million for medical and dental research over 15 years;
 $40 million university scholarship program over 2 years;
 improve crop insurance for farmers;
 create a national dairy marketing board;
 allow full-time farm workers to participate in Unemployment Insurance;
 increase old age security payments;
 $100 million programs to build roads in northern Canada;
 $25 million to support the coal industry in Nova Scotia.

Progressive Conservative Party:
 increase grants to universities;
 special tax deduction for gifts to universities;
 grants to support medical and dental research;
 establish a federal government grain agency;
 provide grants to farmers;
 increase old age security payments from $75 per month to $100 per month for senior citizens over the age of 70;
 create a national water conservation program, and divert water from northern Canada to southern regions;
 develop hydro-electric potential of Nelson River, Peace River and the Bay of Fundy;
 reduce corporate and personal income taxes;
 provide tax deductions for home-owners.

New Democratic Party:
 implement a national medicare program by July 1, 1967;
 eliminate university tuition fees;
 provide grants for universities' capital costs;
 increased funding for technical training;
 increase the minimum price for wheat;
 increase the old age security payment from $75 per month to $100 per month at age 65;
 implement economic planning program that lays down guidelines for wages and prices;
 halt unjustified price increases.

Social Credit Party:
 increased federal aid for education;
 introduce a non-compulsory medicare program;
 require the Bank of Canada to provide loans for government capital projects.

Ralliement des creditistes/Social Credit Rally:
 in lieu of a medicare program, provide government allowance to individuals to buy private medical insurance;
 subsidize farmers' crop losses;
 increase old age security payments to $100 per month immediately, and to $125 per month over time;
 require the Bank of Canada to pay $15 million of dividends to Canadians.

Source: The Globe and Mail newspaper, October 1965.

National results

Notes:

"% change" refers to change from previous election

x - less than 0.005% of the popular vote

1 "Previous" refers to the results of the previous election, not the party standings in the House of Commons prior to dissolution.

Vote and seat summaries

Results by province

xx - less than 0.05% of the popular vote

See also
 
List of Canadian federal general elections
List of political parties in Canada
27th Canadian Parliament

References

Further reading
 
 

 
1965 elections in Canada
1965
November 1965 events in Canada